Roberta Gambarini is a jazz singer from Italy.

Early life
Gambarini was born in Turin, Italy, where she attended jazz concerts, clubs, and festivals with her parents. Her father played the saxophone, and she grew up hearing jazz in the house, and learning by listening to records. Her first instrument was clarinet when she was 12, then piano. When she was 18, she moved to Milan to pursue a career as a vocalist. In Milan she worked in radio and television without making progress on her ambition.

Musical career

Gambarini moved to the U.S. in 1998 and won a scholarship to the New England Conservatory of Music in Boston. A few weeks after her arrival in America, she entered the Thelonious Monk International Jazz Vocals Competition and came in third behind Teri Thornton and Jane Monheit. She was invited to sing in New York City, where she met Benny Carter and James Moody. Moody became her teacher, mentor, and friend.

In 2004, she started touring with the Dizzy Gillespie All Star Big Band, performing with James Moody, Frank Wess, Jimmy Heath, Paquito d'Rivera, and Roy Hargrove. From 2006 to 2007 she toured with her own trio, as well as the Hank Jones trio. She sang at the premiere of "Cannery Row Suite", a piece by Dave Brubeck commissioned for the Monterey Jazz Festival.

Her debut album Easy to Love (Groovin' High, 2006) was nominated for a Grammy Award.

You Are There was a collaboration with Hank Jones.

Her album So in Love was nominated for the Grammy Award for Best Jazz Vocal Album.

Awards
 2007: Easy to Love, nominated for Grammy Award for Best Jazz Vocal Album
 2010: So in Love, nominated for Grammy Award for Best Jazz Vocal Album

Discography 
 Apreslude with Antonio Scarano (Splasch, 1991)
 Easy to Love (Groovin' High, 2006)
 You Are There with Hank Jones (EmArcy, 2007) – recorded in 2005
 So in Love with James Moody, Roy Hargrove (EmArcy, 2009)
 The Shadow of Your Smile: Homage to Japan (Groovin' High, 2013)
 Connecting Spirits: Roberta Gambarini Sings the Jimmy Heath Songbook (Groovin' High, 2015)
 Dedications: Roberta Gambarini Honors Ella, Sarah & Carmen (Groovin' High, 2019)

As guest 
 Dizzy Gillespie All-Star Band, Dizzy's Business, (MCG Jazz, 2006)
 Dizzy Gillespie All-Star Band, I'm Be Boppin' Too  (Half Note, 2009)
 Roy Hargrove Big Band, Emergence (EmArcy, 2009)
 Paul Kuhn, Swing 85 (In+Out, 2013)
 James Moody & Hank Jones, Our Delight (IPO, 2008)
 New Stories, Hope Is in the Air: The Music of Elmo Hope (Origin, 2004)

References

Italian jazz singers
Women jazz singers
Musicians from Turin
Living people
Italian emigrants to the United States
1972 births
21st-century Italian singers
21st-century Italian women singers